Wallace's Monthly was an American sporting magazine founded by John H. Wallace (1822–1903) and published out of New York from 1875–1894. It was dedicated to the coverage of horse racing.

The publication debuted in October 1875 with Wallace as editor and Benjamin Singerly as publisher.  After Singerly died in 1876, Wallace also became publisher.  Wallace sold the publication to the American Trotting Registration Association in 1891.

References

External links
Volume 3 (1877-1878)
Volume 4 (1878–89)
Volume 15 (1889–90)
Volume 17 (1891–92)
Volume 18 (1892–93)
Volume 19 (1893–94)

Magazines established in 1875
Magazines disestablished in 1894
Equine magazines
Sports magazines published in the United States
Horse racing in the United States
1875 establishments in New York (state)
1894 disestablishments in the United States
Defunct magazines published in the United States